This is an alphabetical list of the fungal taxa as recorded from South Africa. Currently accepted names have been appended.

Ta
Genus: Taphrina
Taphrina aurea Sade.
Taphrina deformans Tul.
Taphrina mume Nish.
Taphrina Pruni Tul.
 
Family: Taphrinaceae

Order: Taphrinales

Te
Genus: Teleutospora
Teleutospora ventosa Syd.

Genus: Telimena 
Telimena corticicola Doidge. 
Telimena viventis

Family: Teloschistaceae (Mostly lichens)

Genus: Teloschistes (Lichens)
Teloschistes africanus Zahlbr. 
Teloschistes capensis Malme.
Teloschistes capensis f. puber Malme. 
Teloschistes chrvsocarpoides Wain. 
Teloschistes chrysophthalmus Beltr. 
Teloschistes chrysophthalmus f. armatus Hillm. 
Teloschistes chrysophthalmus f. cinereus Müll.Arg. 
Teloschistes chrysophthalmus var. dilatatus Hillm. 
Teloschistes chrysophthalmus var. pulvinaris Zahlbr. 
Teloschistes controversus var. semigranularis Müll.Arg. 
Teloschistes costatus Hillm. 
Teloschistes derelictus Zahlbr. 
Teloschistes exilis Wain. 
Teloschistes exilis var. dealbatus Hillm. 
Teloschistes exilis var. pulvinatus Hillm.
Teloschistes flavicans Norm . 
Teloschistes flavicans f. minor Cromb. 
Teloschistes flavicans var. costatus Steiner
Teloschistes flavicans var. croceus Müll.Arg. 
Teloschistes flavicans var. dealbatus Zahlbr. 
Teloschistes flavicans var. exilis Müll.Arg. 
Teloschistes flavicans var. intermedius Müll.Arg. 
Teloschistes flavicans var. maximus Zahlbr. 
Teloschistes flavicans var. puber Hillm. 
Teloschistes flavicans var. puberus Müll. Arg. 
Teloschistes flavicans var. pulvinatus Zahlbr. 
Teloschistes flavicans var. validus Miill.Arg. 
Teloschistes hypoglaucus Zahlbr. 
Teloschistes perrugosus Müll.Arg. 
Teloschistes scorigenus Wain. 
Teloschistes validus Hillm. 
Teloschistes verrucosus Hillm. 
Teloschistes villosus Norm. 

Genus: Teratosphaeria
Teratosphaeria fibrillosa Syd.

Genus: Terfezia
Terfezia boudieri Chat. 
Terfezia claveryi Chat. 
Terfezia pfeilii P.Henn.

Genus: Tetracium 
Tetracium rectisporum Petch.

Genus: Tetraploa
Tetraploa aristata Berk. & Br.

Th
Genus: Theissenula
Theissenula woodiana Doidge

Genus: Thelephora Ehrh. ex Willd., (1787)
Thelephora biennis Fr. 
Thelephora fulva Lev. 
Thelephora fuscoviolascens Mont. (1847)
Thelephora hirsuta Willd. 
Thelephora intybacea Pers. ex Fr. 
Thelephora laciniata Pers, ex Fr. 
Thelephora palmata Fr. 
Thelephora pedicellata Schvr. 
Thelephora penicillata Lloyd. 
Thelephora pnlverulenta Lev. 
Thelephora punicea Alb. & Schw. ex Fr. 
Thelephora terrestris Ehrh. ex Fr. 

Family: Thelephoraceae

Genus: Theleporus
Theleporus cretaceus Fr.

Genus: Thelotrema (Lichens)
Thelotrema capense Zahlbr. 
Thelotrema cavatum Ach.
Thelotrema diplochistoidea Vain.
Thelotrema henatomma Ach.
Thelotrema leioplacoides Nyl.
Thelotrema lepadinum Ach.
Thelotrema microglaenoides Wain.
Thelotrema muscigenum Stizenb.
Thelotrema variolarioides Ach.
 
Family: Thelotremaceae

Genus: Thielavia
Thielavia basicola Zopf.

Genus: Thielaviopsis
Thielaviopsis basicola Ferraris.
Thielaviopsis paradoxa (De Seynes) Höhn., (1904), accepted as Ceratocystis paradoxa (Dade) C. Moreau, (1952)

Genus: Thyrinula
Thyrinula eucalyptina Petrak & Syd.
 
Genus: Thyriopsis
Thyriopsis proteae v.d.Byl

Genus: Thyrococcum
Thyrococcum humicola Buchanan

Ti
Genus: Tilletia
Tilletia ayresii Berk, ex Mass.
Tilletia caries Tul.
Tilletia echinosperma Ains.
Tilletia foetans Trel.
Tilletia heterospora Zundel.
Tilletia laevis Kuhn.
Tilletia transvaalensis Zundel.
Tilletia tritici Wint.
Tilletia verrucosa Cooke & Mass.
Tilletia viennotii Syd.
 
Family:Tilletiaceae

Genus: Tilmadoche
Tilmadoche mutabilis Rost.
Tilmadoche nutans Rost.
Tilmadoche viridis

Genus: Tilotus
Tilotus lenzitiformis Kalchbr.
 
Genus: Titaea
Titaea doidgeae Hansf.

Genus: Titanella
Titanella grandis Syd.

To
Genus: Togninia
Togninia quaternarioides Berl.
 
Genus: Tolyposporium
Tolyposporium chloridis P.Henn.
Tolyposporium penicillariae Bref. accepted as Moesziomyces bullatus (J. Schröt.) Vánky, (1977)
Tolyposporium tristachydis Zundel.

Genus: Tomasellia
Tomasellia africana Zahlbr.
 
Genus: Toninia (Lichens)
Toninia bumamma Zahlbr.
Toninia caerulonigricans Th.Fr.
Toninia caesiopallida Zahlbr.
Toninia flava Zahlbr.
Toninia incretata Zahlbr.
Toninia verrucosa Flagey.

Genus: Tornabenia
Tornabenia africana Massal.
Tornabenia capensis Massal.
Tornabenia flavicans Massal.

Genus: Torula Pers., (1795)
Torula fusidium Thuem.
Torula glutinis Pringsh. & Bilewsky.
Torula herbarum Link.
Torula histolyca Stoddard & Cutler.
Torula sacchari Corda.

Genus: Torulopsis
Torulopsis glutinis Doidge.
Torulopsis mucilaginosa Ciferri & Redaelli.
Torulopsis utilis (Henneberg) Lodder, (1934), accepted as Cyberlindnera jadinii (Sartory, R. Sartory, J. Weill & J. Mey.) Minter (2009)

Tr
Genus: Trabutia
Trabutia evansii Theiss. & Syd. 
Trabutia ficuum Theiss. & Syd. 
Trabutia nervisequens Theiss. & Syd.
 
Genus: Trametes
Trametes albotexta Lloyd
Trametes ambigua Fr.
Trametes aratoides Pat. & Har.
Trametes balanina Fr.
Trametes capensis Lloyd.
Trametes captiosa Mont. accepted as Coriolopsis floccosa (Bull.) Murrill, (1903)
Trametes cervina Bres.
Trametes cingulata Berk.
Trametes circinatus Fr.
Trametes corrugata Bres.
Trametes detonsa Fr.
Trametes devexa
Trametes dregeana
Trametes fibrosa Fr.
Trametes funalis Fr.
Trametes gibbosa Fr.
Trametes glabrescens Fr.
Trametes griseo-lilacina v.d.Byl.
Trametes heteromorpha Lloyd.
Trametes hispida Bagl.
Trametes hydnoides (Sw.) Fr., (1838), accepted as Hexagonia hydnoides (Sw.) M.Fidalgo
Trametes hystrix Cooke.
Trametes incerta Curr.
Trametes incondita Fr.
Trametes isidioides Fr.
Trametes keetii v.d.Byl.
Trametes lactea (Fr.) Pilát (1940), accepted as Irpex lacteus (Fr.) Fr. (1828)
Trametes lactinea Fr.
Trametes lanata Fr.
Trametes meyenii Lloyd.
Trametes moesta Kalchbr.
Trametes natalensis Fr.
Trametes obstinatus Cooke.
Trametes ochraceus Lloyd.
Trametes ochrolignea Llovd.
Trametes persoonii Pat.
Trametes pertusa Fr.
Trametes pictus
Trametes proteus Fr.
Trametes rigida Berk. & Mont. accepted as Coriolopsis floccosa (Bull.) Murrill, (1903)
Trametes robiniophila Murr.
Trametes roseola Pat. & Har.
Trametes salebrosa v.d.Byl.
Trametes scalaris Fr.
Trametes sceleton Fr.
Trametes scleroderma Fr.
Trametes sepium Berk.
Trametes serialis Fr.
Trametes serpens Fr.
Trametes suaveolens Fr.
Trametes subflava Lloyd.
Trametes sycomori P.Henn.
Trametes tomentosa v.d.Byl.
Trametes torrida Fr.
Trametes trabea (Pers.) Bres. (1897), accepted as Gloeophyllum trabeum (Pers.) Murrill (1908)
Trametes umbrina Fr.
Trametes ursina (Link) Fr., (1849), accepted as Hexagonia hydnoides (Sw.) M.Fidalgo
Trametes varians v.d.Byl.
Trametes violacea Lloyd.
Trametes wahlbergii Fr.
Trametes zimmermannii Bres.
 
Genus: Tranzschelia
Tranzschelia punctata Arth.

Genus: Tremella
Tremella alba Kalchbr.
Tremella corrugis Fr.
Tremella crassa Lloyd.
Tremella epigaea Berk. & Br.
Tremella frondosa Fr.
Tremella fuciformis Berk.
Tremella hemifoliacea Lloyd.
Tremella lutescens Pers. ex Fr.
Tremella mesenterica Retz. ex Fr.
Tremella micropera Kalchbr. & Cooke.
Tremella microspora Lloyd.
Tremella moriformis Berk.
 
Family: Tremellaceae

Family: Tremellineae

Genus: Treubiomyces
Treubiomyces celastri Doidge

Genus: Trichamphora
Trichamphora pezizoides Jungh.

Genus: Trichasterina 
Trichasterina popowiae Doidge

Genus: Trichobasis
Trichobasis cichoracearum Lev. accepted as Coleosporium tussilaginis (Pers.) Lév. (1849)
Trichobasis hypoestis Cooke
Trichobasis labmtarum Lev.
Trichobasis rubigo-vera (DC.) Lév. (1849), accepted as Puccinia recondita Dietel & Holw. (1857)
Trichobasis vernoniae Cooke.
Trichobasis zehneriae Thuem.
 
Genus: Trichoderma
Trichoderma lignorum (Tode) Harz, (1871), accepted as Trichoderma viride Pers., (1794)
Trichoderma viride Pers. (1794),

Genus: Trichodochium
Trichodochium disseminatum Syd.

Genus: Trichoglossum
Trichoglossum hirsutum Boud.

Genus: Tricholoma
Tricholoma album Quel.
Tricholoma amarum Rea.
Tricholoma caffrorum Sacc.
Tricholoma caffrorum var. sulonense Sacc.
Tricholoma cerinum Quel.
Tricholoma gambosum Gill.
Tricholoma gambosum var. capense Kalchbr. & MacOwan.
Tricholoma georgii Quel.
Tricholoma melaleucum Quel.
Tricholoma melaleucum var. adstringens Quel.
Tricholoma melaleucum var. prophyroleucum Gill.
Tricholoma nudum Quel. (sic) possibly (Bull.) P.Kumm. (1871), accepted as Clitocybe nuda (Bull.) H.E.Bigelow & A.H.Sm. (1969)
Tricholoma personatum Quel.
Tricholoma russula Gill.
Tricholoma saponaceum Quel.
Tricholoma ustale Quel.

Genus: Trichopeltaceae
Trichopeltaceae

Genus: Trichopeltula
Trichopeltula carissae Doidge
Trichopeltula kentaniensis Doidge

Genus: Trichophyton
Trichophyton mentagrophytes Gedoelst.
Trichophyton purpureum Bang.
Trichophyton roseum Sabouraud.
Trichophyton sulfureum Sabouraud.
Trichophyton violaceum Sabouraud.

Family: Trichophytoneae

Genus: Trichospaeria
Trichospaeria vandae Verw. & du Pless.
 
Genus: Trichosporium
Trichosporium purpureum Mass.
 
Genus: Trichothecium
Trichothecium roseum Link.

Fanily: Trichothyriaceae

Genus: Trichothyrium
Trichothyrium dubiosum Theis.
Trichothyrium elegans Doidge
Trichothyrium robustum Doidge

Genus: Trichotrema
Trichotrema trichosporum Clements

Genus: Tripospora
Tripospora cookei Sacc.
Tripospora tripos Lindau.
 
Genus: Triposporium
Triposporium stapeliae du Pless.
 
Genus: Trochodium
Trochodium ipomoeae Syd.

Genus: Tryblidaria
Tryblidaria breutelii Rehm .
Tryblidaria capensis Vouaux.
 
Genus: Tryblidiella
Tryblidiella rufula (Spreng.) Sacc. (1883), accepted as Rhytidhysteron rufulum (Spreng.) Speg. (1920)

Genus: Tryblidium
Tryblidium rufulum Spreng.
 
Family: Trypetheliaceae (Mostly lichens)

Genus: Trypethelium (Lichens)
Trypethelium austroafricanum Zahlbr.
Trypethelium bicolor Taylor.
Trypethelium eluteriae Spreng.
Trypethelium phlyctaena Fee.
Trypethelium sprengelii Ach.
Trypethelium verrucosum Fee.

Tu
Family: Tuberaceae

Order: Tuberales

Genus: Tubercularia
Tubercularia fici Edgert.
Tubercularia minor Link.
Tubercularia persicina Ditm.
Tubercularia vulgaris Tode. accepted as Nectria cinnabarina (Tode) Fr. (1849)
 
Family: Tuberculariaceae

Genus: Tuberculina
Tuberculina malvacearum Speg.
Tuberculina persicina Sacc.
 
Family: Tubulinaceae

Genus: Tubercinia
Tubercinia eriospermi Syd.
Tubercinia ornithoglossi Syd.
 
Genus: Tulostoma
Tulostoma adherens Lloyd.
Tulostoma albicans White.
Tulostoma album Mass.
Tulostoma angolense Welw. & Curr.
Tulostoma australianum Lloyd.
Tulostoma bonianum Pat.
Tulostoma brumale Pers.
Tulostoma cyclophorum Lloyd.
Tulostoma lacticeps Bres.
Tulostoma lesliei v.d.Byl.
Tulostoma macowani Bres.
Tulostoma mammosum Fr.
Tulostoma mammosum var. squamosum Fr.
Tulostoma obesum Cooke & Ellis.
Tulostoma poculatum White.
Tulostoma purpusii P.Henn.
Tulostoma squamosum Pers.
Tulostoma transvaalii Lloyd

Family: Tulostomataceae E.Fisch. (1900), accepted as Agaricaceae Chevall. (1826)

Ty
Genus: Tylophoron
Tylophoron africanum Vain.
Tylophoron bylii Merrill

Genus: Tympanopsis
Tympanopsis euomphala Starb.

References

Sources

See also
 List of bacteria of South Africa
 List of Oomycetes of South Africa
 List of slime moulds of South Africa

 List of fungi of South Africa
 List of fungi of South Africa – A
 List of fungi of South Africa – B
 List of fungi of South Africa – C
 List of fungi of South Africa – D
 List of fungi of South Africa – E
 List of fungi of South Africa – F
 List of fungi of South Africa – G
 List of fungi of South Africa – H
 List of fungi of South Africa – I
 List of fungi of South Africa – J
 List of fungi of South Africa – K
 List of fungi of South Africa – L
 List of fungi of South Africa – M
 List of fungi of South Africa – N
 List of fungi of South Africa – O
 List of fungi of South Africa – P
 List of fungi of South Africa – Q
 List of fungi of South Africa – R
 List of fungi of South Africa – S
 List of fungi of South Africa – T
 List of fungi of South Africa – U
 List of fungi of South Africa – V
 List of fungi of South Africa – W
 List of fungi of South Africa – X
 List of fungi of South Africa – Y
 List of fungi of South Africa – Z

Further reading
Kinge TR, Goldman G, Jacobs A, Ndiritu GG, Gryzenhout M (2020) A first checklist of macrofungi for South Africa. MycoKeys 63: 1-48. https://doi.org/10.3897/mycokeys.63.36566

  

Fungi
Fungi T